CDG may refer to:

Transport
 Charles de Gaulle Airport (IATA code), Paris, France
 Chandigarh railway station
 ComfortDelGro, a Singaporean multinational land transport company
 Shandong Airlines (ICAO code), based in Shandong, China
 French aircraft carrier Charles de Gaulle (R91)
 Carriage of Dangerous Goods, associated with ADR (treaty)

People
 Charles de Gaulle, French general and President

Organization
 Caisse de dépôt et de gestion, Moroccan pension fund
 Gulf Cartel or Cartel del Golfo, a criminal syndicate and drug trafficking organization in Mexico
 Congenital disorder of glycosylation also known as CDG Syndrome
 Costume Designers Guild
 Cave Diving Group
 Comme des Garçons, a Japanese fashion company 
 CDG Nepal, a Nepali online news portal

Compound
 Calcium diglutamate

Computers
 CD+G or CD+Graphics, a format of Compact Disc including both audio and video graphics
 Card-driven game, a type of wargaming
 CAIA Delay-Gradient, in computer networking, a congestion control algorithm